The 1939 High Peak by-election was held on 7 October 1939.  The by-election was held due to the death of the incumbent Conservative MP, Alfred Law.  It was won by the Conservative candidate Hugh Molson.

References

1939 elections in the United Kingdom
1939 in England
1930s in Derbyshire
By-elections to the Parliament of the United Kingdom in Derbyshire constituencies
Unopposed by-elections to the Parliament of the United Kingdom (need citation)